Raći is a settlement in the municipality of Podgorica, Montenegro.

Momir Bulatović is buried in Raći.

Demographics
According to the 2011 census, its population was 30.

References

Populated places in Podgorica Municipality